Viktor Mikhayloviç Pereverzev (former Azerbaijani: Виктор Михайлович Переверзев, born 17 June 1958 in Topchikha, Altai Krai) is an Azerbaijani former rower who competed for the Soviet Union in the 1980 Summer Olympics.

He was born in Altai Krai, Russian SFSR.

In 1980 he was a crew member of the Soviet boat which won the silver medal in the coxed pairs event.

External links
 profile

1958 births
Living people
People from Altai Krai
Azerbaijani male rowers
Soviet male rowers
Russian male rowers
Olympic rowers of the Soviet Union
Rowers at the 1980 Summer Olympics
Olympic silver medalists for the Soviet Union
Olympic medalists in rowing
Medalists at the 1980 Summer Olympics
World Rowing Championships medalists for the Soviet Union
Sportspeople from Altai Krai